Starless and Bible Black is the sixth studio album by English progressive rock band King Crimson, released in March 1974 by Island Records in the United Kingdom and by Atlantic Records in the United States. It carries over most of the same lineup which appeared on the preceding album, Larks' Tongues in Aspic, with only percussionist Jamie Muir not returning. In order to more faithfully capture the band's live energy, much of the material on this album was tracked in concert and edited together with studio recordings.

Background and production

King Crimson's previous album, Larks' Tongues in Aspic (on which they had moved decisively away from a more traditional progressive rock sound drawing on American jazz, and towards the influence of European free improvisation), had been recorded by a quintet lineup of the band, including experimental percussionist Jamie Muir. Early in 1973, Muir abruptly left the band, ostensibly due to an onstage injury, but in fact due to an overwhelming spiritual need which led him to retreat from music and join a monastery (something which was not communicated to his bandmates at that time). The band's drummer, Bill Bruford, absorbed Muir's percussion role in addition to his own kit drumming, and the band continued to tour as a quartet.

These upheavals and the pressure of touring left King Crimson short of new written material when it came to the time to record their next album. Having increased their level of onstage improvisation during recent tours, the band opted to take advantage of this to solve the problem. New compositions tried out in concert and captured on several live recordings were presented as part of the new album material, alternating and in some cases blending with studio recordings.

The only songs recorded entirely in the studio were the first two tracks, "The Great Deceiver" and "Lament". "We'll Let You Know" was an entirely improvised piece recorded in Glasgow. "The Mincer" was another improvised piece, originally recorded in concert at the Volkshaus in Zürich but overdubbed with Wetton's vocals in the studio; The track was the edited-out middle section of a longer improvisation, in which the tape ran out mid-performance, with which "The Mincer" ends. The other parts were released on The Great Deceiver as "The Law of Maximum Distress, Parts One & Two". "Trio", "Starless and Bible Black" and "Fracture" (the last of which Robert Fripp has cited as one of the most difficult guitar pieces he has ever played) were recorded live at the Concertgebouw in Amsterdam. Also recorded at the Concertgebouw was the introduction to "The Night Watch" (the band's Mellotron broke down at the start of the next section, meaning that the remainder of the song needed to be recorded in the studio and dubbed in later). In all cases, live applause was removed from the recordings wherever possible (although the remains of it can be heard by an attentive listener). The complete Amsterdam Concertgebouw concert was eventually released by the band in 1997 as The Night Watch.
    
"Trio" was notable for being a quartet piece with only three active players – John Wetton on bass guitar, David Cross on viola and Robert Fripp on "flute" Mellotron. Bruford spent the entire piece with his drumsticks crossed over his chest, waiting for the right moment to join in but eventually realized that the improvised piece was progressing better without him. His decision not to add any percussion was seen by the rest of the band as a crucial choice, and he received co-writing credit for the piece. "Trio" was later included on the 1975 compilation album A Young Person's Guide to King Crimson, the performance credits of which cite Bruford's contribution to the piece as having been "admirable restraint."

A sequel or related piece to "Fracture" was released by a different King Crimson lineup in 2000 on The ConstruKction of Light, titled "FraKctured".

Content 

Only four tracks on the album have lyrics. As had been the case with Larks' Tongues in Aspic, these were written by John Wetton's friend Richard Palmer-James (the former Supertramp guitarist who'd left the band after its first, self-titled album). "The Great Deceiver" refers to The Devil and is an ironic commentary on commercialism (Fripp contributed the line "cigarettes, ice cream, figurines of the Virgin Mary" after seeing souvenirs being marketed in Vatican City). "Lament" is about fame. "The Night Watch" is a short essay on Rembrandt's painting of the same name, describing the painting as an observer sees it and attempting to understand the subjects. "The Mincer" has more ambiguous lyrics, though lines such as "fingers reaching, linger shrieking", "you're all alone, baby's breathing", and the song's title could be references to a home invader or killer.  Original issues of the album include the lyrics to "The Great Deceiver," "Lament" and "The Night Watch" on the album's inner sleeve.

The phrase "Starless and Bible Black" is a quotation from the first two lines of poet Dylan Thomas's play, Under Milk Wood. The band's next album, Red, contains a song called "Starless", which contains the phrase "Starless and bible black", whereas "Starless and Bible Black" is an improvised instrumental. The title track on both the album and the compact disc is an edit of the original Amsterdam improvisation as performed at the Concertgebouw, which presumably ran several minutes longer (as improvisations of this tour often did). (The sleeve notes included with the CDs indicate that it was cut short for the 1973 album "due to the constraints of vinyl"). All currently-available master tapes contain the 9:11 version.

The album art is by painter Tom Phillips. The phrase "this night wounds time", which appears on the back cover, is a quotation from Phillips's signature work, the "treated Victorian novel" A Humument (p. 222).

Reception

Rolling Stone called the album "as stunningly powerful as In the Court of the Crimson King", praising Bruford's mastery of his percussive style and the successful integration of David Cross's violin and viola as a counter-soloist to Fripp. They found the album's variety of tones and lengthy instrumental improvisations particularly impressive, and concluded, "Fripp has finally assembled the band of his dreams – hopefully it'll stay together long enough to continue producing albums as excellent as this one."

AllMusic also praised the album's variety of tones in their retrospective review, and remarked that the album's second side "threw the group's hardest sounds right in the face of the listener, and gained some converts in the process." Robert Christgau's review was more ambiguous, deeming it "as close as this chronically interesting group has ever come to a good album", though he would eventually give higher ratings to Red and USA.

Legacy 
In 2004, Pitchfork ranked it at number 94 in their list of the "Top 100 Albums of the 1970s."

The Japanese band Acid Mothers Temple recorded an album entitled Starless and Bible Black Sabbath in 2006 as a double homage to Starless and Bible Black and Black Sabbath's self-titled album.

Track listing

Personnel

King Crimson
 Robert Fripp – guitar, Mellotron, devices, Hohner pianet, production
 John Wetton – bass, vocals, production
 Bill Bruford – drums, percussion, production
 David Cross – violin, viola, Mellotron, Hohner pianet, production

Additional personnel
 George Chkiantz – engineering
 Peter Henderson – engineering assistance
 Richard Palmer-James – lyrics
 Tom Phillips – cover design
 "Equipment by Chris and Tex"

Charts

References

External links
 
 Entry on Elephant Talk, contains lyrics and other info

King Crimson albums
1974 albums
albums produced by Robert Fripp
Island Records albums
Atlantic Records albums
Polydor Records albums
E.G. Records albums
Virgin Records albums
Experimental rock albums
Locust Music artists